The governor of New Hampshire is the head of government of the U.S. state of New Hampshire.

The governor is elected during the biennial state general election in November of even-numbered years. New Hampshire is one of only two states, along with bordering Vermont, to hold gubernatorial elections every two years as opposed to every four. Currently, the state's 82nd governor is Republican Chris Sununu, who has served since January 5, 2017. 

In New Hampshire, the governor has no term limit of any kind. Only two governors have served more than three terms since the 18th century (when the term was for only one year), John Lynch, who won a fourth two-year term on November 2, 2010, and Sununu, who won a fourth two-year term on November 8, 2022. John Taylor Gilman had been the last governor before Lynch to serve longer than six years, serving 14 one-year terms as governor between 1794 and 1816. Gilman is one of seven governors to serve non-consecutive terms, the others being John Langdon, John Sullivan, William Plumer, Benjamin Pierce, James A. Weston, and John Gilbert Winant.

Unlike in many other states in which Executive Councils are merely advisory, the Executive Council of New Hampshire has a strong check on the governor's power. The five-member council has a veto over many actions of the governor. Together, the Governor and Executive Council approve contracts with a value of $5,000 or more, approve pardons, and appoint the directors and commissioners, judges, the Attorney General and officers in the National Guard.

To be qualified to be governor, one must be 30 years of age, a registered voter, and domiciled in New Hampshire for at least seven years.

Title
Traditionally, the governors of the colonial Province of New Hampshire were titled as "President of New Hampshire", beginning with the appointment of the province's first president, John Cutt, in 1679. After independence, from 1786 to 1791, "President of the State of New Hampshire" was the official style of the position. The New Hampshire Constitution was amended in 1791 to replace "President" with "Governor".

Function 
The Constitution of New Hampshire details the duties and powers of the Governor:
 Act as a supreme executive magistrate
 Shall be responsible for the faithful execution of the laws
 When a disagreement exists between the two legislative chambers, the Governor with advice of the executive council shall have the right to adjourn or prorogue the general court
 The Governor may direct a session of the General Court to be held at another location within the state in cases where there is danger to the health or lives of the members
 Power to veto bills and resolutions presented to the Governor by the General Court
 Nomination of all judicial officers, the attorney general, and all officers of the militia with the approval of the executive council
 Act as the Commander in Chief for all military forces of the state
 Power to pardon offenses, except those convicted by the Senate and impeached by the House
 Money issued out of the state treasury shall be by warrant under the hand of the Governor and with advice of the council

Succession

Established by Part 2, Article 49 of the Constitution of New Hampshire.

References

External links

Official
 
 General information
 
 Governors of New Hampshire at The Political Graveyard
 

Governor
Government